The 2021 CS Denis Ten Memorial Challenge was held on October 28–31, 2021 in Nur-Sultan, Kazakhstan. It was part of the 2021–22 ISU Challenger Series. Medals were awarded in the disciplines of men's singles, women's singles, and ice dance.

Entries 
The International Skating Union published the list of entries on September 28, 2021.

Changes to preliminary assignments

Results

Men

Women

Ice dance

References

External links 
 Denis Ten Memorial Challenge at the International Skating Union
 Results

Denis Ten Memorial Challenge
Denis Ten Memorial Challenge
Denis Ten Memorial Challenge
International figure skating competitions hosted by Kazakhstan